Petr Olegovich Gumennik (born 11 April 2002) is a Russian figure skater. He is the 2020 Rostelecom Cup bronze medalist and 2019 CS Warsaw Cup silver medalist. He is also the 2020 World Junior bronze medalist and 2018 Junior Grand Prix Final silver medalist.

Personal life 
Gumennik was born on 11 April 2002 in Saint Petersburg, Russia.

Career

Early years 
Gumennik began learning to skate in 2006. In March 2014, he won gold at the Russian Youth Championships – Younger Age. The following season, he placed fifth at the Russian Junior Championships and repeated as the champion at the Russian Youth Championships – Younger Age.

2015–2016 season 
In August 2015, Gumennik debuted on the ISU Junior Grand Prix (JGP) series, coached by Oleg Tataurov, Tatiana Mishina, and Alexei Mishin. He placed sixth at the 2015 JGP in Riga, Latvia, and then fourth in Toruń, Poland. At the 2016 Russian Junior Championships, he finished sixth.

2016–2017 season 
In September, Gumennik competed at two 2016 JGP events, placing fourth in Saransk, Russia, and then fifth in Tallinn, Estonia. He placed ninth at the 2017 Russian Junior Championships. During the season, he was coached by Alexei Mishin.

2017–2018 season 
Veronika Daineko became his coach in 2017. Gumennik won the silver and bronze at the Russian Cup 2017–2018 stages, won bronze at the Russian Cup Final, finished eighth at the 2018 Russian Junior Championships and won silver at the Russian Youth Championships – Elder Age.

2018–2019 season 
Coached by Daineko and Vladislav Sesganov, Gumennik started his season with a gold medal at the 2018 JGP event in Vancouver, Canada. He ranked fourth in the short program but won the free skate and outscored the silver medalist, Tomoki Hiwatashi, by a margin of about seven points. At this event, he scored his personal best score of 220.04 points, and his free skating score of 150.35 points was the junior men's new record score. At his second JGP event of the season, he won another gold medal, now in Ljubljana, Slovenia. He was ranked first in both the short program and the free skate, and again he beat the same silver medalist, Tomoki Hiwatashi, this time by about 4 points. With two JGP gold medals, Gumennik qualified for the 2018–19 Junior Grand Prix Final, where he won the silver medal after placing third in the short program and second in the free skate.  In January, he took gold at the 2019 Skate Helena.

In February 2019, Gumennik won the silver medal at the 2019 Russian Junior Championships after placing first in the short program and fourth in the free skate.  Assigned to the 2019 World Junior Championships, he was fourth in the short program with a new personal best, and eleventh in the free program, and tenth overall.

2019–2020 season 
In the 2019–2020 season, Petr Gumennik remained on the Russian junior figure skating team, coached by Veronika Dainek, Alexander Ustinov and choreographer Nikolai Moroshkin.  On August 5 and 6, at the open skates of the Russian junior team in Novogorsk, Gumennik showed new short and free programs. Both programs were choreographed by Nikita Mikhailov. Gumennik said his goals for the season were to qualify for the JGP Final and win a medal at the Junior World Championship. He also said he planned to move to the senior level the following season and would attempt three quads in the free program, two Salchows and one Lutz.

Beginning the season on the 2019–20 Junior Grand Prix, Gumennik won the gold medal at the event in Chelyabinsk, Russia. At this event, he scored his personal best score of 222.14 points and made his first attempt at the quad Lutz, which ended in a step out.  At his second event in Egna, Italy, Gumennik placed second behind Daniel Grassl.  He then competed at the senior level at the 2019 CS Warsaw Cup, winning the silver medal.

Qualifying for the Junior Grand Prix Final, he placed fourth in the short program after falling on his opening triple Axel. He was fifth in the free skate after falling on his quad Lutz attempt and underrotating three other jumps and placed fifth overall.

At the 2020 Russian Championships, Gumennik ranked third in the short program, with only a mirror spin error. Gumennik overslept and missed the morning practice session for the free skate, where he came tenth with errors on his quad Salchow attempts and dropped to seventh overall.

After winning a silver medal at the Russian Junior Championships, Gumennik earned one of Russia's three berths at the 2020 World Junior Championships in Tallinn, Estonia. He placed ninth in the short program after putting a hand down on his triple Axel attempt. He placed second in the free skate, rising to the bronze medal position overall, only 0.63 points behind silver medalist Yuma Kagiyama.

Gumennik added Tamara Moskvina as a consultant to his coaching team in 2019.

2020–2021 season 
Turning to the senior ranks full-time, Gumennik debuted his programs at the senior Russian test skates.  Competing on the domestic Cup of Russia series, he won the bronze medal at the second stage in Moscow.

With the COVID-19 pandemic continuing to affect international travel, the ISU opted to run the Grand Prix based primarily on geographic location, and Gumennik was assigned to the 2020 Rostelecom Cup.  He placed second in the short program with a clean skate.  He was sixth in the free skate, falling on an underrotated quad Salchow, but won the bronze medal.

A week before the 2021 Russian Championships, Gumennik began to suffer back pain which limited his training.  He placed eighth in the short program after falling on his triple Axel and landing badly on his quad Salchow attempt.  He was seventh in the free skate, rising to seventh place overall.

Gumennik participated in the 2021 Russian Cup Final, taking the silver medal.

2021–2022 season 
Gumennik won the 2021 CS Denis Ten Memorial Challenge to open the season, setting new personal bests. His first Grand Prix assignment was initially the 2021 Cup of China, but following its cancellation, he was reassigned to the 2021 Gran Premio d'Italia in Turin. He placed eighth at the event. 

At the 2022 Russian Figure Skating Championships, Gumennik finished in fifth. He said that he was "satisfied as I did everything I am capable of at this point" and vowed to add more quadruple jumps in the future.

Programs

Records and achievements 
 Set the junior-level men's record of the new +5 / -5 GOE (Grade of Execution) system for the free program (150.35 points) at the 2018 JGP Canada.  This record was subsequently broken by Stephen Gogolev.

Competitive highlights 
GP: Grand Prix; CS: Challenger Series; JGP: Junior Grand Prix

Detailed results 
Current ISU world best highlighted in bold and italic. Personal best highlighted in bold.

Senior

Junior

References

External links 
 

! colspan="3" style="border-top: 5px solid #78FF78;" |World Junior Record Holders

2002 births
Russian male single skaters
Living people
Figure skaters from Saint Petersburg
World Junior Figure Skating Championships medalists